Matisia stenopetala is a species of flowering plant in the family Malvaceae sensu lato or Bombacaceae. It is found only in Peru.

References

stenopetala
Endemic flora of Peru
Vulnerable flora of South America
Taxonomy articles created by Polbot